Ludwig Hoelscher (23 August 19078 May 1996) was a German cellist. He played internationally as a soloist, and was well known as a chamber musician, first playing from 1932 in Elly Ney's piano trio, then in the Strub Quartet and other formations. He was an important cellist of the Nazi era, playing in propaganda concerts and teaching in Berlin and Salzburg. After the World War, he taught at the Musikhochschule Stuttgart and played internationally. He played the world premieres of more than 50 compositions.

Life 
Born in Solingen, Hoelscher was the youngest of three children of a jeweller and amateur violinist, who wanted to form a family string quartet. Ludwig began playing the cello at age six. From the age of nine he gained experience in domestic chamber music.

Hoelscher studied cello in Cologne, Munich, with Julius Klengel in Leipzig and with Hugo Becker in Berlin. He completed his studies with Wilhelm Lamping. In 1930 he received  the highest recognition for music students. Hoelscher made his debut as a soloist in 1931 with the Berliner Philharmoniker conducted by Max Fiedler. His career began with meeting the pianist Elly Ney, who founded the Elly Ney Piano Trio in 1932 with him and violinist Wilhelm Stross.  Theodor Hausmann dedicated his 1935 cello sonata, Op. 30, to Hoelscher and performed it with him. From 1934 to 1938, Hoelscher was the cellist of the Strub Quartet in Berlin.

Career for Nazi propaganda 
Hoelscher was one of the most important musicians of the Nazi era, which is reflected in his inclusion in the Gottbegnadeten list, published in August 1944, which set him free him from military service.

On 1 May 1937, Hoelscher became a member of the National Socialist German Workers' Party (membership number 5.156.776). Since 1 April 1937, the 29-year-old was a professor at the Berlin University of the Arts. On 29 May 1938, he was soloist in the final concert of the first Reichsmusiktage in Düsseldorf, where the Nazi propaganda exhibition on degenerate music was also shown. In the same year, Hoelscher performed at the Beethoven Days of the Hitlerjugend in Wildbad and at the cultural-political work camp of the Reichsjugendführer in Weimar and played for the "Lichtfest" in front of the staff of four industrial companies.

From 1938 Hoelscher also worked as professor at the Mozarteum in Salzburg. For the purpose of "cultural propaganda", he performed in 1942 in occupied Belgium at travelling concerts for the Wehrmacht in Antwerp, Ghent, Mechelen, Leuven, Lier and St. Niklaas. These concerts were repeated in 1943, with additional performances in Bucharest, Lemberg, Lublin and Warsaw. Only a few months before the end of the war, on 2 December 1944, he performed in Krakow with the Philharmonie des Generalgouvernements, an orchestra of Polish players founded by Hans Frank for propaganda purposes. Frank noted in his diary: "Krakow concert with Prof. Hoelscher". This concert, conducted by Hans Swarowsky, featured the premiere of Pfitzner's Krakauer Begrüßung, dedicated to Hans Frank.

Career in post-war Germany 
From 1954 to 1972, he was a professor at the Musikhochschule Stuttgart. Numerous concert tours took him around the world, including the first trip to Japan in 1953, where he became an honorary member of the Ueno University of Tokyo. Among many awards, he also received the honorary membership of the Beethoven House in Bonn.

Hoelscher formed a piano trio with Walter Gieseking and Gerhard Taschner. He played chamber music also with Hans Richter-Haaser, Wilhelm Kempff, Wilhelm Keilmann, Carl Seemann, Adrian Aeschbacher and Kurt Rapf. He premiered over 50 works, including compositions by Wolfgang Fortner, Hans Werner Henze, Ernst Krenek, Pfitzner, Günter Bialas, Harald Genzmer, Martin Karl Hasse, Karl Höller, Peter Jona Korn, Casimir von Pászthory, Joseph Rheinberger, Heinrich Sutermeister and Ermanno Wolf-Ferrari. He also played German premieres of works by Paul Hindemith. He made numerous recordings, some of which have also been released as CDs (Bayer Records; Hänssler Verlag; forgotten-records, France).

Hoelscher died in Tutzing at the age of 88.

Further reading 
 Erich Valentin: Cello, das Instrument und sein Meister Ludwig Hoelscher. Neske, Pfullingen 1955.
 Max Kaindl-Hönig: Ludwig Hoelscher (Die großen Interpreten). Kister, Genf 1964.
 Wolf-Eberhard von Lewinski: Ludwig Hoelscher. Schneider, Tutzing 1967.
 Hans Schneider (ed.): Ludwig Hoelscher zum 75. Geburtstag. Schneider, Tutzing 1982.
 Fred K. Prieberg: Handbuch Deutsche Musiker 1933–1945. CD-ROM-Lexikon. Kiel 2004.
 Ernst Klee: Das Kulturlexikon zum Dritten Reich. Wer war was vor und nach 1945. S. Fischer, Frankfurt 2007, .

References

External links 
 
 

1907 births
1996 deaths
People from Solingen
German classical cellists
Knights Commander of the Order of Merit of the Federal Republic of Germany
Academic staff of the Berlin University of the Arts
Academic staff of Mozarteum University Salzburg
Nazi Party members
20th-century classical musicians
20th-century cellists